The United Nations uses three definitions for what constitutes a city, as not all cities in all jurisdictions are classified using the same criteria. Cities may be defined as the cities proper, the extent of their urban area, or their metropolitan regions.

Definitions

City proper (administrative) 

A city can be defined by its administrative boundaries, otherwise known as city proper. UNICEF defines city proper as, "the population living within the administrative boundaries of a city or controlled directly from the city by a single authority." A city proper is a locality defined according to legal or political boundaries and an administratively recognised urban status that is usually characterised by some form of local government. Cities proper and their boundaries and population data may not include suburbs.

The use of city proper as defined by administrative boundaries may not include suburban areas where an important proportion of the population working or studying in the city lives. Because of this definition, the city proper population figure may differ greatly with the urban area population figure, as many cities are amalgamations of smaller municipalities (Australia), and conversely, many Chinese cities govern territories that extend well beyond the traditional "city proper" into suburban and rural areas. The Chinese municipality of Chongqing, which claims the largest city proper in the world by population, comprises a huge administrative area of 82,403 km2, around the size of Austria. However, more than 70% of its 30-million population are actually agricultural workers living in a rural setting.

Urban area 

A city can be defined as a conditionally contiguous urban area, without regard to territorial or other boundaries inside an urban area. UNICEF defines urban area as follows:

According to Demographia, an urban area is a continuously built up land mass of urban development that is within a labor market (metropolitan area or metropolitan region) and contains no rural land.

Metropolitan area 

A city can be defined by the inhabitants of its demographic population, as by metropolitan area, or labour market area. UNICEF defines metropolitan area as follows:

In many countries, metropolitan areas are established either with an official organisation or only for statistical purposes. In the United States, metropolitan statistical area (MSA) is defined by the U.S. Office of Management and Budget (OMB). In the Philippines, metropolitan areas have an official agency, such as Metropolitan Manila Development Authority (MMDA), which manages Manila metropolitan area. Similar agencies exist in Indonesia, such as Jabodetabekjur Development Cooperation Agency for Jakarta metropolitan area.

List 
There are 81 cities in the world with a population exceeding 5 million people, according to 2018 estimates by the United Nations. The U.N. figures include a mixture of city proper, metropolitan area, and urban area.

See also

 Historical urban community sizes
 List of largest cities throughout history
 List of towns and cities with 100,000 or more inhabitants

Notes

References

External links
 UNSD Demographics Statistics – City population by sex, city and city type
 Nordpil World Database of Large Urban Areas, 1950–2050

{authority control}}

Cities-related lists of superlatives
Largest things
Lists of cities (worldwide) by population
Urban geography